Zebra Lounge is a 2001 erotic thriller directed by Kari Skogland and starring Kristy Swanson, Stephen Baldwin, Brandy Ledford, and Cameron Daddo. It was written by Claire Montgomery and Monte Montgomery.

Plot
Alan and Wendy Barnet are stuck in a marital rut and decide to answer an ad they find in a Swinging magazine. The couple meets with Jack and Louise Bauer at the Zebra Lounge. The Bauers are a pair of experienced swingers who help the Barnets fulfill their sexual fantasies. However, Alan and Wendy soon realize that the Bauers are not who they seem to be.

Cast
Kristy Swanson - Louise Bauer
Stephen Baldwin - Jack Bauer
Brandy Ledford - Wendy Barnet
Cameron Daddo - Alan Barnet
Dara Perlmutter - Brooke Barnet
Daniel Magder - Daniel Barnet
Vincent Corazza - Neil Bradley
Brian Paul - Adam Frazier
Howard Hoover - Bill Wallace
J.D. Nicholsen - Detective
Brandan Turcic - Evan
Chris Gillett - Hank
Judy White - Janet
Stephen Fretwell - Paul McGrew
Joan Gregson - Grandma Margaret
Stephanie Moore - Marissa Wallace 
Larissa Gomes - Marnie
Shani Scherenzel - Tina

Home media
The film was released on DVD and VHS in January 2002.

References

External links

2000s erotic thriller films
2001 television films
2001 films
Canadian television films
English-language Canadian films
2000s English-language films
Canadian erotic thriller films
Films directed by Kari Skogland
2000s Canadian films